The 1987 Hong Kong Masters was a professional non-ranking snooker tournament held from 2 to 6 September 1987 at the Queen Elizabeth Stadium in Hong Kong. Eight professional players and eight local amateur players participated. Steve Davis won the title, defeating Stephen Hendry 9–3 in the final. The tournament was sponsored by billiard table manufacturers Riley.

The event was part of the World Series for the 1987–88 snooker season, a series of invitational snooker events organised by Barry Hearn of Matchroom Sport and Barrie Gill of CSS International, and endorsed by the World Professional Billiards and Snooker Association. Eight events were planned, but only three took place, which Hearn blamed on a sponsor withdrawing and competition for TV airtime with other sporting events.

The highest  of the tournament was 92 by Jimmy White, in the fourth frame of his semi-final match against Stephen Hendry.

Prize Fund 

Winner: £30,000
Runner-up: £12,000
Semi-final: £8,000
Quarter-final: £4,000
Highest break: £1,000

Main draw

References

1987 in snooker
1987 in Hong Kong sport
Sport in Hong Kong